The Parry Sound CPR Trestle crosses the valley of the Seguin River, just upstream of the river's mouth at Parry Sound on Georgian Bay, as well as Great North Road, Bay, and Gibson streets in the town of Parry Sound, Ontario, Canada.

The first scheduled train passed over the span in 1908.  

In July 1914, Tom Thomson (who inspired the Group of Seven) visited Parry Sound and painted the bridge and the former Parry Sound Lumber Company.

Today the trestle provides northbound rail traffic for both the Canadian Pacific Railway and the Canadian National Railway while all southbound traffic uses Canadian National trackage.  This sharing of resources was adopted by the competing companies as a way of alleviating congestion in Central Ontario.

References

External links

 Includes circa 1920 image.
CPR Bridge - Parry Sound, images from the David Thomas Collection exhibit at the West Parry Sound District Museum

Canadian Pacific Railway bridges in Ontario
Bridges in Parry Sound District
Rail transport in Parry Sound, Ontario
Rail infrastructure in Parry Sound District
Bridges completed in 1907